WWWF may refer to:

 World Wide Wrestling Federation, original name of what is now World Wrestling Entertainment (WWE)
 WWFK, a radio station (107.1 FM) licensed to serve Dannemora, New York, United States, which held the WWWF call sign from 2017 through 2018